Arson Mapfumo (born 1 October 1963) is a Zimbabwean boxer. He competed in the men's flyweight event at the 1996 Summer Olympics.

References

1963 births
Living people
Zimbabwean male boxers
Olympic boxers of Zimbabwe
Boxers at the 1996 Summer Olympics
Place of birth missing (living people)
Flyweight boxers